Waspam Airport  is an airport serving Waspam, a town on the Coco River on Nicaragua's border with Honduras.

Airlines and destinations

See also

 List of airports in Nicaragua
 Transport in Nicaragua
 Honduras–Nicaragua border

References

External links
 OurAirports - Waspam Airport

Airports in Nicaragua
North Caribbean Coast Autonomous Region